Tanurjeh (also Romanized as Tanūrjeh and Tanoorjeh; also known as Tanūrah, Tanūrcheh, Tonvareh, and Tonvarjeh) is a village in Barkuh Rural District, Kuhsorkh County, Razavi Khorasan Province, Iran. At the 2006 census, its population was 895, in 238 families.

References 

Populated places in Kuhsorkh County